Theme or themes may refer to:

 Theme (arts), the unifying subject or idea of the type of visual work
 Theme (Byzantine district), an administrative district in the Byzantine Empire governed by a Strategos
 Theme (computing), a custom graphical appearance for certain software.
 Theme (linguistics), topic
 Theme (narrative)
 Theme Building, a landmark building in the Los Angeles International Airport
 Theme music a piece often written specifically for a radio program, television program, video game, or film, and usually played during the intro, opening credits, or ending credits
 Theme vowel or thematic vowel, a vowel placed before the word ending in certain Proto-Indo-European words
 Subject (music), sometimes called theme, a musical idea, usually a recognizable melody, upon which part or all of a composition is based

Media
 Theme (album), by Leslie West
 Theme (magazine)
 The Theme, a 1979 Soviet film
 "Theme," by Flying Lotus, from the album You're Dead!
 "The Theme (It's Party Time)," a 1997 song by Tracey Lee
 Themes (Clannad album), 1992
 Themes (Vangelis album), 1989
 Themes (Silent Stream of Godless Elegy album), 2000

See also
 Thema (disambiguation)